Zaťovič, feminine: Zatovičová is a Slovak-language surname derived from the word zať, son-in-law. Notable people with the surname include:

Juraj Zaťovič (born 1982), Slovak water polo player
Martin Zaťovič (born 1985), Czech ice hockey player
Mária Zatovičová, Slovak paralympic skier

See also
Zetov

Slovak-language surnames